Vyacheslav Yevgenyevich Dusmanov (born 8 June 1973) is a former Russian football player.

He played in the 2002–03 UEFA Cup for FC Gomel, allowing 8 goals in two games against FC Schalke 04.

External links
 

1973 births
Sportspeople from Izhevsk
Living people
Soviet footballers
Russian footballers
Association football goalkeepers
Russian Premier League players
Russian expatriate footballers
Expatriate footballers in Latvia
Expatriate footballers in Belarus
FC Dynamo Moscow reserves players
FC Lada-Tolyatti players
Dinaburg FC players
FC Gomel players
FC Sibir Novosibirsk players
FC Neman Grodno players
FC Novokuznetsk players